This is a list of veterinary schools throughout the world by country.

Afghanistan
 Kabul University Veterinary Science Faculty
 Herat University Veterinary Science Faculty
 Nangarhar University Veterinary Science Faculty
 Kunduz University Veterinary Science Faculty
 Khost University Veterinary Science Faculty
 Mazar-e-Sharif University Veterinary Science Faculty
 Helman University Veterinary Science Faculty
 Kandahar University Veterinary Science Faculty
 Bamyan University Veterinary Science Department

Albania
 Agricultural University of Tirana Faculty of Veterinary Medicine
 WorldWide University Veterinary Science Programme

Algeria
 Higher National Veterinary School
 Saad Dahlab University of Blida Department of Veterinary Sciences
 University of Batna Veterinary Department
 University of Ibn Khaldoun, Tiaret
 University of Mentouri – Constantine Faculty of Natural and Life Sciences
 University of Taref Veterinary Departement

Angola
 José Eduardo dos Santos University Faculty of Veterinary Medicine

Argentina
 Catholic University of Cordoba Faculty of Agricultural and Veterinary Sciences
 Catholic University of Cuyo, San Luis campus Faculty of Veterinary Sciences
 Juan Agustín Maza University Faculty of Veterinary and Environmental Sciences
 National University of Central Buenos Aires Faculty of Veterinary Sciences
 National University of La Pampa Faculty of Veterinary Sciences
 National University of La Plata Faculty of Veterinary Sciences
 National University of the Littoral Faculty of Veterinary Sciences
 National University of the Northeast Faculty of Veterinary Sciences
 National University of Río Cuarto Faculty of Agronomy and Veterinary Sciences
 National University of Rosario Faculty of Veterinary Sciences
 National University of Tucumán Faculty of Veterinary Sciences
 University of Buenos Aires Faculty of Veterinary Sciences
 University of El Salvador Veterinary Medicine Course
 National University of Villa María Instituto Académico Pedagógico de Ciencias Básicas y Applicadas

Australia
Australia has seven schools of veterinary medicine:
 Charles Sturt University School of Animal and Veterinary Sciences
 James Cook University, College of Public Health, Medical and Veterinary Sciences
 Murdoch University School of Veterinary and Life Sciences
 University of Adelaide School of Veterinary Science
 University of Melbourne Melbourne Veterinary School
 University of Queensland School of Veterinary Science
 University of Sydney Faculty of Veterinary Science

Austria
 University of Veterinary Medicine Vienna

Bangladesh
 Bangladesh Agricultural University Faculty of Veterinary Science
 Sylhet Agricultural University Faculty of Veterinary, Animal and Biomedical Sciences
 Bangabandhu Sheikh Mujibur Rahman Agricultural University Faculty of Veterinary Medicine and Animal Science
 Chittagong Veterinary and Animal Sciences University
 Hajee Mohammad Danesh Science & Technology University Faculty of Veterinary & Animal Science
 Patuakhali Science and Technology University Faculty of Animal science and veterinary medicine, Barishal campus
 Jhenaidah Government Veterinary College, Jhenidah, Bangladesh
 Rajshahi University Faculty of  Veterinary & Animal Sciences
 Sher-e-Bangla Agricultural University Faculty of Animal Science and Veterinary Medicine
 Gono University Faculty of Veterinary & Animal Sciences(Private University)
Khulna Agricultural University, khulna
Sirajganj Government Veterinary college
Bangabandhu Sheikh Mujibur Rahman Science and Technology University, Gopalganj

Belarus
 Gorkovskii Agricultural Institute
 Vitebsk State Academy of Veterinary Medicine

Belgium
  Faculty of Veterinary Medicine, University of Liège, Liège
Faculty of Veterinary Medicine, Ghent University, Ghent
School of Veterinary Medicine, Faculty of Science, UCLouvain, Louvain-la-Neuve (undergraduate only)
Faculty of Medicine, Université libre de Bruxelles, Anderlecht (undergraduate only)
 
 Faculty of Pharmaceutical, Biomedial, and Veterinary Science, University of Antwerp, Antwerp (undergraduate only)

Bolivia
 Autonomous University of Beni "José Ballivián" Faculty of Livestock Sciences
 Gabriel René Moreno Autonomous University Veterinary Sciences Faculty

Bosnia and Herzegovina
 University of Sarajevo Veterinary Faculty

Brazil
Federal University of Bahia
 Center of Higher Teaching of Campos Gerais Veterinary Medicine
 Federal University of Goiás Veterinary and Husbandry School
 Federal University of Lavras Department of Veterinary Medicine
 Federal University of Minas Gerais
 Federal University of Pampa
 Federal University of Paraíba Center of Agricultural Sciences
 Federal University of Paraná
 Federal University of Pelotas College of Veterinary Medicine
 Federal University of Pernambuco
 Federal University of Rio Grande do Sul Faculty of Veterinary Sciences
 Federal University of Santa Maria Veterinary Medicine
 Federal University of Viçosa Veterinary Department
 Fluminense Federal University
 Paulista Júlio State University of Mesquita Filho, Botucatu campus Faculty of Veterinary Medicine and Husbandry
 Paulista Júlio State University of Mesquita Filho, Jaboticabal campus Faculty of Veterinary Medicine and Husbandry
 Pontifical Catholic University of Paraná School of Agriculture and Veterinary Medicine
 Rural Federal University of Rio de Janeiro
 Santa Catarina State University Veterinary and Agricultural Center
 Universidade Estadual de Maringá
 UNICENTRO – Universidade Estadual do Centro-Oeste do Paraná
 University of Brasília Faculty of Agronomy and Veterinary Medicine
 University of São Paulo Faculty of Veterinary Medicine / Faculty of Animal Science and Food Engineering (Pirassununga, SP) - 
 Vila Velha University
Universidade Estadual do Ceará/ Faculdade de Veterinária (UECE/FAVET

Bulgaria
 Trakia University Faculty of Veterinary Medicine
 University of Forestry, Sofia Faculty of Veterinary Medicine

Canada
Canada has five schools of veterinary medicine:
 Atlantic Veterinary College, University of Prince Edward Island
 Ontario Veterinary College, University of Guelph
 Université de Montréal Faculty of Veterinary Medicine
 University of Calgary Faculty of Veterinary Medicine
 Western College of Veterinary Medicine, University of Saskatchewan

Chile
 Austral University of Chile Faculty of Veterinary Sciences
 Mayor University Veterinary Medicine
 San Sebastián University Veterinary Medicine
 Santo Tomás University Veterinary Medicine
 University of the Americas Faculty of Veterinary Medicine and Agronomy
 University of Chile Faculty of Veterinary Sciences and Livestock
 University of Concepción Faculty of Veterinary Sciences

China

 College of Animal Husbandry and Veterinary Medicine Shenyang Agricultural University China
 College of Animal Science and Technology Anhui Agricultural University Hefei city China
 College of Animal Science and Technology Animal diseases institute China
 College of Animal Science and Veterinary Medicine Heilongjiang Bayi Agricultural University China
 College of Animal Science and Veterinary Medicine Shanxi Agricultural University China
 College of Veterinary Medicine HeBei Agricultural China
 College of Veterinary Medicine Huazhong Agricultural University China
 College of Veterinary Medicine Northwest A&F University China
 College of Veterinary Medicine Southwest Uniwersity China
 Department of Animal Medicine Agricultural college of Yanbian Uniweisity China
 Life Science and Engineering College Northwest University for Nationalities China
 Veterinary College Northeast Agricultural University China
 Veterinary Medicine Department, College of Life Science and Technology Southwest University for nationalities China
 Animal science and veterinary medicine college Tianjin agricultural University China
 China Agricultural University College of Veterinary Medicine Beijing China
 College of Animal Science and Technolog Guangxi University China
 College of Animal Science and Technolog Qingdao Agricultural University China
 College of Animal science and technology HeNan University of science and technology China
 College of Animal Science and Veterinary Medicine Henan institute of science and technology China
 College of Animal Science/Veterinary Medicine Shandong Agricultural University China
 College of Veterinary Medicine Inner Mongolia Agricultural University China
 College of Veterinary Medicine Jiangxi Agricultural University China
 College of Veterinary Medicine Yangzhou University China
 College of Veterinary Medicine, South China Agricultural University China
 College of Veterinary Medicine.Sicau Sichuan Agriculture University China
 Henan Agricultural University, College of Animal Husbandry and Veterinary Science Henan China
 Huazhong Agricultural University, College of Veterinary Medicine Wuhan · Hubei Province China
 Jiangsu–Yangzhou University, College of Veterinary Medicine Yangzhou, Jiangsu China                          * The College of Veterinary Medicine at Nanjing Agricultural University (NAU) China
 Zhejiang Agricultural University College of Animal Science & Veterinary Medicine Hangzhou China

Costa Rica
 Escuela de Medicina y Cirugía Veterinaria San Francisco de Asís, Universidad Veritas
 National University of Costa Rica School of Veterinary Medicine

Croatia
 University of Zagreb Faculty of Veterinary Medicine

Czech Republic
 University of Veterinary and Pharmaceutical Sciences Brno

Denmark
Royal Veterinary and Agricultural University (1856–2007)
UCPH School of Veterinary Medicine and Animal Science (2012–)

Dominica
 St. Nicholas University: School of Veterinary Medicine

Ecuador
 Central University of Ecuador
 San Francisco University of Quito
 Universidad Agraria del Ecuador
 Universidad de las Américas

Egypt
 Alexandria University Faculty of Veterinary Medicine
 Assiut University Faculty of Veterinary Medicine
 Benha University Faculty of Veterinary Medicine
 Beni-Suef University Faculty of Veterinary Medicine
 Cairo University Faculty of Veterinary Medicine
 Damanhour University Faculty of Veterinary Medicine
 Kafr El-Sheikh University Faculty of Veterinary Medicine
 Mansoura UniversityMansoura University Faculty of Veterinary Medicine
 Menoufia University Faculty of Veterinary Medicine
 Minia University Faculty of Veterinary Medicine
 Sohag University Faculty of Veterinary Medicine
 South Valley University Faculty of Veterinary Medicine
 Suez Canal University Faculty of Veterinary Medicine
 Zagazig University Faculty of Veterinary Medicine
 Badr University Faculty of Veterinary Medicine

Estonia
 Estonian University of Life Sciences Institute of Veterinary Medicine and Animal Sciences

Ethiopia
 Addis Ababa University College of Veterinary Medicine
 Jimma University College of Agriculture and Veterinary Medicine
 University of Gondor Faculty of Veterinary Medicine
 Mekelle University College of Veterinary Medicine

Finland
 University of Helsinki Faculty of Veterinary Medicine

France

 Nantes-Atlantic National College of Veterinary Medicine, Food Science and Engineering (former National Veterinary School of Nantes)
 National Veterinary School of Alfort
 National Veterinary School of Toulouse
 National Veterinary School of Lyon

Germany
 Free University of Berlin Department of Veterinary Medicine
 Ludwig Maximilian University of Munich Faculty of Veterinary Medicine.
 University of Giessen Faculty of Veterinary Medicine
 University of Leipzig Faculty of Veterinary Medicine
 University of Veterinary Medicine Hanover

Ghana

 Kwame Nkrumah University of Science and Technology, Kumasi School of Veterinary Medicine
 University of Ghana School of Veterinary Medicine

Greece
 Aristotle University of Thessaloniki Faculty of Veterinary Medicine
 University of Thessaly Faculty of Veterinary Medicine

Grenada
 St. George's University School of Veterinary Medicine

Hong Kong
College of Veterinary Medicine and Life Sciences

Hungary
 University of Veterinary Medicine Budapest

India
 Anand Agricultural University College of Veterinary Science and Animal Husbandry, Anand, Gujarat
 Assam Agricultural University Faculty of Veterinary Science
 Banaras Hindu University Faculty of Veterinary and Animal Sciences, Barkachha, Mirzapur
 Bihar Veterinary College
 Birsa Agricultural University Ranchi College of Veterinary Science and Animal Husbandry
 Bombay Veterinary College
 Central Agricultural University College of Veterinary Sciences and Animal Husbandry, Selesih
 Central Institute for Research on Buffaloes, Hisar, Haryana
 Central Sheep Breeding Farm, Hisar, Haryana
 Chaudhary Charan Singh Haryana Agricultural University College of Veterinary Sciences, Hisar
 CSK Himachal Pradesh Agricultural University Dr. G.C. Negi College of Veterinary and Animal Sciences
 Desh Bhagat University Desh Bhagat School of Veterinary Sciences, Mandi Gobindgarh, Punjab
 G. B. Pant University of Agriculture and Technology College of Veterinary and Animal Sciences
 Guru Angad Dev Veterinary and Animal Sciences UniversiIndian Veterinary Research Institute
 Karnataka Veterinary, Animal and Fisheries Sciences University
Veterinary College, Bangalore
 Veterinary College, Bidar
 Veterinary College, Hassan 
 Veterinary College, Shivamogga
 Kerala Veterinary and Animal Sciences University
 College of Veterinary and Animal Sciences, Pookote
 College of Veterinary and Animal Science, Thrissur
 Lala Lajpat Rai University of Veterinary and Animal Sciences, Hisar
 Nanaji Deshmukh Veterinary Science University
 College of Veterinary Science & Animal Husbandry, Jabalpur
 College of Veterinary Science & Animal Husbandry, Mhow
 Maharashtra Animal and Fishery Sciences University
 College of Veterinary and Animal Science, Udgir
 College of Veterinary and Animal Sciences, Parbhani
 K.N.P. College of Veterinary Sciences
 Nagpur Veterinary College
 Post Graduate Institute of Veterinary & Animal Sciences, Akola
 National Dairy Research Institute, Karnal
 National Research Centre on Equines, Hisar
 N. T. Rama Rao College of Veterinary Science
 Navsari Agricultural University College of Veterinary Science and Animal Husbandry, Navsari, GUJARAT
 Rajasthan University of Veterinary and Animal Sciences
 Rajendra Agricultural University
 Rajiv Gandhi College of Veterinary and Animal Sciences
 Sardarkrushinagar Dantiwada Agricultural University College of Veterinary Science & Animal Husbandry, GUJARAT
 SK University of Agricultural Sciences and Technology of Kashmir Faculty of veterinary Sciences and Animal Husbandry
 Sri Venkateswara University
College of Veterinary Science, Gannavaram
College of Veterinary Science, Hyderabad
College of Veterinary Science, Korutla
College of Veterinary Science, Tirupati
 Tamil Nadu Veterinary and Animal Sciences University
 Madras Veterinary College
 Veterinary College and Research Institute at Orathanau in Thanjavur
 Veterinary College and Research Institute at Ramayanpatti in Tirunelveli
 Veterinary College and Research Institute, Namakkal
 Uttar Pradesh Pandit Deen Dayal Upadhyaya Pashu Chikitsa Vigyan Vishwavidyalaya Evam Go College of Veterinary Science & Animal Husbandry
 West Bengal University of Animal and Fishery Sciences

Indonesia
 Airlangga University College District of Banyuwangi Faculty of Veterinary Medicine
 Airlangga University Faculty of Veterinary Medicine
 Bogor Agricultural University Faculty of Veterinary Medicine
 Gadjah Mada University Faculty of Veterinary Medicine
 Hasanuddin University, Faculty of Veterinary Medicine
 Nusa Cendana University Undana Faculty of Veterinary Medicine
 Syiah Kuala University Faculty of Veterinary Medicine
 Udayana University Faculty of Veterinary Medicine
 University of Brawijaya Faculty of Veterinary Medicine
 University of Nusa Tenggara Barat Faculty of Veterinary Medicine
 University of Wijaya Kusuma Surabaya Faculty of Veterinary Medicine
 University of Padjadjaran Bandung Faculty of Veterinary Medicine

Islamic Republic of Iran 
 Razi University of Kermanshah Faculty of Veterinary Medicine
 Science and Research Branch of the Islamic Azad University, Faculty of Specialized Veterinary Medicine
 Shahid Chamran University of Ahvaz Faculty of Veterinary Medicine
 University of Kerman Faculty of Veterinary Medicine
 University of Mashhad Faculty of Veterinary Medicine
 University of Semnan Faculty of Veterinary Medicine
 University of Shahrekord Faculty of Veterinary Medicine
 University of Shiraz School of Veterinary Science
 University of Tabriz Faculty of Veterinary Medicine
 University of Tehran Faculty of Veterinary Medicine 
 University of Urmia Faculty of Veterinary Medicine
 Amol University of Special Modern Technologies, Faculty of Veterinary Medicine, Amol

Iraq
 College of Veterinary Medicine, University of Baghdad
 College of Veterinary Medicine, University of Basrah
 College of Veterinary Medicine, University of Diyala
 College of Veterinary Medicine, University of Fallujah
 College of Veterinary Medicine, University of Mosul
 College of Veterinary Medicine, University of Tikrit

Ireland

 University College Dublin

Israel

 Hebrew University of Jerusalem Koret School of Veterinary Medicine

Italy

 University of Bari Faculty of Veterinary Medicine
 University of Bologna Faculty of Veterinary Medicine
 University of Camerino Faculty of Veterinary Medicine
 University of Messina Faculty of Veterinary Medicine
 University of Milan Faculty of Veterinary Medicine
 University of Naples Federico II Faculty of Veterinary Medicine
 University of Padua Faculty of Veterinary Medicine
 University of Parma Faculty of Veterinary Medicine
 University of Perugia Faculty of Veterinary Medicine
 University of Pisa Faculty of Veterinary Medicine
 University of Sassari Faculty of Veterinary Medicine
 University of Teramo Faculty of Veterinary Medicine
 University of Turin Faculty of Veterinary Medicine

Japan
Seventeen institutions in Japan have schools of veterinary medicine:
 Azabu University School of Veterinary Medicine
 Gifu University, United School of Veterinary Sciences
 Hokkaido University Graduate School of Veterinary Medicine
 Iwate University, Department of Veterinary Medicine
 Kagoshima University, Department of Veterinary Medicine
 Kitasato University School of Veterinary Medicine
 Nihon University, Department of Veterinary Medicine
 Nippon Veterinary and Life Science University, Department of Veterinary Science
 Obihiro University of Agriculture and Veterinary Medicine, School of Veterinary Medicine
 Okayama University of Science
 Osaka Prefecture University, Graduate School of Life & Environmental Sciences
 Rakuno Gakuen University School of Veterinary Medicine
 Tokyo University of Agriculture and Technology, United Graduate School of Veterinary Sciences
 Tottori University, School of Veterinary Medicine
 University of Miyazaki Faculty of Agriculture, Department of Veterinary Sciences
 University of Tokyo, Faculty of Agriculture, Department of Veterinary Medical Sciences
 Yamaguchi University, Department of Veterinary Medicine

Jordan
 Jordan University of Science and Technology Faculty of Veterinary Medicine

Kenya
University of Nairobi Faculty of Veterinary Medicine

Kosovo
University of Prishtina Faculty of Agriculture and Veterinary

Lebanon
 Lebanese University Faculty of Agricultural Engineering and Veterinary Medicine

Libya
 Omar Al-Mukhtar University Faculty of Veterinary Medicine
 University of Alfateh Faculty of Veterinary Medicine

Lithuania
 Lithuanian University of Health Sciences

Malaysia
 Kelantan University, Malaysia Faculty of Veterinary Medicine
 Putra University, Malaysia Faculty of Veterinary Medicine

Mexico
 Autonomous Agrarian University of "Antonio Narro" Unidad Laguna Faculty of Veterinary Medicine and Zootechnics
 Autonomous University of Aguascalientes Center for Agricultural Sciences
 Autonomous University of Baja California Institute of Investigations in Veterinary Sciences
 Autonomous University of Juárez City Institute of Biomedical Sciences
 Autonomous University of Mexico State Faculty of Veterinary Medicine and Zootechnics
 Autonomous University of Nuevo León Faculty of Veterinary Medicine and Zootechnics
 Autonomous University of Querétaro Faculty of Natural Sciences
 Autonomous University of Tamaulipas Faculty of Veterinary Medicine and Zootechnics
 Autonomous University of Yucatán Faculty of Veterinary Medicine and Zootechnics
 Autonomous University of Zacatecas Faculty of Veterinary Medicine and Zootechnics
 Centro de Estudios Universitarios Faculty of Veterinary Medicine and Zootechnics
 Meritorious Autonomous University of Puebla Faculty of Veterinary Medicine and Zootechnics
 Metropolitan Autonomous University, Xochimilco Division of Biological Sciences and Health
 Michoacana University of San Nicolás of Hidalgo Division for Biological and Agricultural Sciences
 National Autonomous University of Mexico Faculty of Veterinary Medicine and Zootechnics
 National Autonomous University of Mexico Graduate School of Cuautitlán
 Sonora Institute of Technology Department of Agricultural and Veterinary Sciences
 Universidad Veracruzana Faculty of Veterinary Medicine and Zootechnics
 University of Guadalajara University Center for Biological and Agricultural Sciences
 University of the Valley of Mexico, Coyoacán School of Veterinary Medicine and Zootechnics

Morocco
 Agronomic and Veterinary Institute of Hassan II Polytechnic Center of Earth and Life Sciences

Myanmar
 University of Veterinary Science, Yezin

Nepal
 Agriculture and Forestry University
 Himalayan College of Agricultural Science and Technology
 Institute of Agriculture and Animal Science
 Nepal Polytechnic Institute, Bharatpur 11 Chitwan

Netherlands
 University of Utrecht Faculty of Veterinary Medicine

New Zealand
 Massey University Faculty of Veterinary Science

Nigeria 
 Ahmadu Bello University Zaria, Kaduna
 Federal University of Agriculture, Abeokuta, Ogun
 Federal University of Agriculture Makurdi, Benue
 Michael Okpara University of Agriculture, originally the Federal University of Agriculture, Umudike, Abia State
 University of Abuja, Abuja
 University of Ibadan, Oyo
 University of Ilorin, Kwara
 University of Maiduguri, Borno
 University of Nigeria Nsukka. Enugu state
 Usman Fodio University Sokoto, Sokoto
 University of Jos, Plateau State

North Macedonia
 Saints Cyril and Methodius University of Skopje Faculty of Veterinary Medicine

Norway
 Norwegian School of Veterinary Science

Pakistan
 Faculty of Veterinary and Animal Sciences (FVAS), MNS University of Agriculture, Multan
 Bahauddin Zakariya University
 Cholistan University of Veterinary and Animal Sciences, Bahawalpur
 College of Veterinary and Animal Sciences, Jhang
 Gomal College of Veterinary Sciences
 Islamia University
 Lasbela University of Agriculture, Water and Marine Sciences
 Pir Mehr Ali Shah Arid Agriculture University
 Riphah College of Veterinary Sciences
 Sindh Agriculture University
 University of Agriculture, Faisalabad
 University of Agriculture, Peshawar
 University of Poonch
 University of Veterinary and Animal Sciences

Panama
 Facultad de Medicina Veterinaria Universidad de Panamá

Peru
 Cayetano Heredia University Veterinary and Zootechnic Faculty
 National University of San Marcos Faculty of Veterinary Medicine
 Scientific University of the South Veterinary Medicine and Zootechnics
UPC Medicina Veterinaria
Universidad Pedro Ruiz Gallo Medicina Veterinaria

Philippines

Luzon
 Benguet State University, College of Veterinary Medicine
 Cagayan State University, College of Veterinary Medicine
 Cavite State University, College of Veterinary Medicine and Biomedical Sciences
 Central Bicol State University of Agriculture, Institute of Veterinary Medicine
 Central Luzon State University, College of Veterinary Science and Medicine
 De La Salle-Araneta University, College of Veterinary Medicine and Agricultural Sciences
 Don Mariano Marcos Memorial State University-Bacnotan Campus, La Union campus College of Veterinary Medicine
 Isabela State University, School of Veterinary Medicine
 Nueva Vizcaya State University, Doctor of Veterinary Medicine 
 Pampanga State Agricultural University, College of Veterinary Medicine
 Tarlac Agricultural University, Institute of Veterinary Medicine
 University of the Philippines Los Baños, College of Veterinary Medicine
 Virgen Milagrosa University Foundation. College of Veterinary Medicine

Mindanao
 Central Mindanao University College of Veterinary Medicine
 University of Southern Mindanao College of Veterinary Medicine University of Southern Mindanao

Visayas
 Aklan State University, School of Veterinary Medicine
 Capiz State University-Main Campus, Doctor of Veterinary Medicine 
 Capiz State University-Dumarao Campus, Doctor of Veterinary Medicine 
 Cebu Technological University-Barili Campus, College of Agriculture and Veterinary Sciences
 Southwestern University-South Campus College of Veterinary Medicine
 University of Eastern Philippines College of Veterinary Medicine
 Visayas State University College of Veterinary Medicine

Poland
 University Center of Veterinary Medicine of the Jagiellonian University and Agricultural University of Cracow
 University of Life Sciences in Lublin Faculty of Veterinary Medicine
 University of Life Sciences in Poznan Faculty of Veterinary Medicine and Animal Science
 University of Warmia and Mazury in Olsztyn Faculty of Veterinary Medicine
 Warsaw University of Life Sciences Faculty of Veterinary Medicine
 Wroclaw University of Environmental and Life Sciences Faculty of Veterinary Medicine

Portugal
Portugal has six schools of veterinary medicine:
 Universidade Lusófona, Faculty of Veterinary Medicine
 University of Lisbon Faculty of Veterinary Medicine
 University of Évora, Department of Veterinary Medicine
 University of Porto Abel Salazar Biomedical Sciences Institute
 University of Trás-os-Montes and Alto Douro School of Agrarian and Veterinary
 Vasco da Gama College, Department of Veterinary Medicine

Romania
 Banat University of Agricultural Sciences and Veterinary Medicine Faculty of Veterinary Medicine
 Ion Ionescu de la Brad University of Agricultural Sciences and Veterinary Medicine of Iași Faculty of Veterinary Medicine
 University of Agricultural Sciences and Veterinary Medicine of Cluj-Napoca Faculty of Veterinary Medicine
 University of Agronomical Sciences and Veterinary Medicine Faculty of Veterinary Medicine

Saint Kitts
 Ross University School of Veterinary Medicine

Saudi Arabia
 King Faisal University College of Veterinary Medicine and Animal Resources

Senegal
 Interstate University of Veterinary Science and Medicine in Dakar

Serbia
 University of Belgrade Faculty of Veterinary Medicine
 University of Novi Sad Faculty of Agriculture

Slovakia
 University of Veterinary Medicine in Košice

Slovenia
 University of Ljubljana Faculty of Veterinary Medicine

South Africa
 University of Pretoria Faculty of Veterinary Science

South Korea
 Chonnam National University College of Veterinary Medicine
 Chungbuk National University College of Veterinary Medicine
 Chungnam National University College of Veterinary Medicine
 Gyeongsang National University College of Veterinary Medicine
Jeonbuk National University College of Veterinary Medicine
 Jeju National University College of Veterinary Medicine
 Kangwon National University College of Veterinary Medicine
 Konkuk University College of Veterinary Medicine
 Kyungpook National University College of Veterinary Medicine
 Seoul National University College of Veterinary Medicine

Spain
 Alfonso X el Sabio University Veterinary Faculty
 Autonomous University of Barcelona Veterinary Faculty
 CEU Cardinal Herrera University Veterinary Faculty
 Complutense University of Madrid Veterinary Faculty
 University of Córdoba Veterinary Faculty
 University of Extremadura Veterinary Faculty
 University of Las Palmas de Gran Canaria Veterinary Faculty
 University of León, Faculty of Veterinary Medicine
 University of Santiago de Compostela, Faculty of Veterinary Medicine 
 University of Murcia Veterinary Faculty
 University of Zaragoza Veterinary Faculty

Sri Lanka
 University of Peradeniya Faculty of Veterinary Medicine and Animal Science

Sudan
 Sudan University of Science and Technology College of Veterinary Medicine
 University of Albutana Faculty of Veterinary Medicine
 University of Bahri Faculty of Veterinary Medicine
 University of Gezira Faculty of Veterinary Medicine
 University of Khartoum Faculty of Veterinary Medicine
 University of Nyala Faculty of Veterinary Medicine
 University of West Kordofan Faculty of Veterinary Medicine

Sweden
 Swedish University of Agricultural Sciences Faculty of Veterinary Medicine

Switzerland
 University of Bern Faculty of Veterinary Medicine
 University of Zurich Faculty of Veterinary Medicine

Taiwan
 National Chiayi University Department of Veterinary Medicine
 National Chung Hsing University College of Veterinary Medicine
 National Pingtung University of Science and Technology College of Veterinary Medicine
 National Taiwan University School of Veterinary Medicine
Asia University department of veterinary medicine

Thailand
 Chiang Mai University Faculty of Veterinary Science
 Chulalongkorn University Faculty of Veterinary Science
 Kasetsart University Faculty of Veterinary Medicine
 Khon Kaen University Faculty of Veterinary Medicine
 Mahanakorn University of Technology Faculty of Veterinary Science
 Mahasarakham University Faculty of Veterinary Medicine and Animal Science
 Mahidol University Faculty of Veterinary Science
 Prince of Songkla University Faculty of Veterinary Science
 Rajamangala University of Technology Srivijaya Faculty of Veterinary Science
 Rajamangala University of Technology Tawan-ok Faculty of Veterinary Science
 Western University Faculty of Veterinary Science
 Walailak University Akkraratchakumari Veterinary College

Trinidad and Tobago 

 University of the West Indies School of Veterinary Medicine

Turkey
Bingöl University Faculty of Veterinary Medicine
 Adnan Menderes University Faculty of Veterinary Medicine
Ankara University Faculty of Veterinary Medicine
 Atatürk University Faculty of Veterinary Medicine
 Balıkesir University Faculty of Veterinary Medicine
 Cumhuriyet University Faculty of Veterinary Medicine University
 Dicle University Faculty of Veterinary Medicine
 Erciyes University Faculty of Veterinary Medicine
 Fırat University Faculty of Veterinary Medicine
 Harran University Faculty of Veterinary Medicine
Istanbul University Faculty of Veterinary Medicine
 Kafkas University Faculty of Veterinary Medicine University
Kırıkkale University Faculty of Veterinary Medicine
Kocatepe University Faculty of Veterinary Medicine
Mehmet Akif Ersoy University Faculty of Veterinary Medicine
 Mustafa Kemal University Faculty of Veterinary Medicine
 Ondokuz Mayıs University Faculty of Veterinary Medicine
 Selçuk University Faculty of Veterinary Medicine
 Uludağ University Faculty of Veterinary Medicine
Yüzüncüyıl University Faculty of Veterinary Medicine

Tunisia 
 National School of Veterinary Medicine of Sidi Thabet

Uganda
 Makerere University School of Veterinary Medicine

Ukraine
 Dnipropetrovsk State Agricultural University Faculty of Veterinary Science
 National Agricultural University of Bela-Cerkva Faculty of Veterinary Science
 National Agricultural University of Luhansk Faculty of Veterinary Science
 National Agricultural University of Ukraine Faculty of Veterinary Science
 Odessa State Agrarian University Faculty of Veterinary Science
 Sumy National Agricultural University Faculty of Veterinary Science
 Zhytomir National Academy of Agriculture and Ecological Sciences Faculty of Veterinary Science

United Kingdom

Cayman Islands
 St. Matthew's University School of Veterinary Medicine

England
 University of Bristol School of Veterinary Science
 University of Cambridge Veterinary School
 University of Liverpool Faculty of Veterinary Science
 University of London Royal Veterinary College
 University of Nottingham School of Veterinary Medicine and Science
 University of Surrey School of Veterinary Medicine
 Harper Adams University & Keele University Harper & Keele Veterinary School

Scotland
 University of Edinburgh Royal (Dick) School of Veterinary Studies
 University of Glasgow School of Veterinary Medicine

Wales
 University of Aberystwyth School of Veterinary Science

United States
Thirty-two veterinary colleges are accredited in the United States:
 Auburn University College of Veterinary Medicine
 Colorado State University College of Veterinary Medicine and Biomedical Sciences
 Cornell University College of Veterinary Medicine
 Iowa State University College of Veterinary Medicine
 Kansas State University College of Veterinary Medicine
 Lincoln Memorial University
 Long Island University
 Louisiana State University School of Veterinary Medicine
 Michigan State University College of Veterinary Medicine
 Midwestern University College of Veterinary Medicine
 Mississippi State University College of Veterinary Medicine
 North Carolina State University College of Veterinary Medicine
 Ohio State University College of Veterinary Medicine
 Oklahoma State University College of Veterinary Medicine
 Oregon State University College of Veterinary Medicine
 Purdue University College of Veterinary Medicine
 Texas A&M College of Veterinary Medicine & Biomedical Sciences
 Texas Tech University
 Tufts University Cummings School of Veterinary Medicine
 Tuskegee University School of Veterinary Medicine
 University of California, Davis School of Veterinary Medicine
 University of Florida College of Veterinary Medicine
 University of Georgia College of Veterinary Medicine
 University of Illinois at Urbana–Champaign College of Veterinary Medicine
 University of Minnesota College of Veterinary Medicine
 University of Missouri College of Veterinary Medicine
 University of Pennsylvania School of Veterinary Medicine
 University of Tennessee College of Veterinary Medicine
 University of Wisconsin at Madison School of Veterinary Medicine
 Virginia–Maryland College of Veterinary Medicine
 Washington State University College of Veterinary Medicine
 Western University of Health Sciences College of Veterinary Medicine

Venezuela
 Central University of Venezuela Faculty of Veterinary Science
 Francisco de Miranda National Experimental University Faculty of Veterinary Sciences
 Lisando Alvarado Western Central University Faculty of Veterinary Sciences
 Rómulos Gallegos National Experimental University of the Central Plains Faculty of Veterinary Sciences
 University of Zulia Faculty of Veterinary Science

West Indies
 Ross University School of Veterinary Medicine
 St. George's University
 St. Matthew's University
 University of the West Indies, St. Augustine Campus School of Veterinary Medicine
 St. Nicholas University: School of Veterinary Medicine

See also

 Lists of schools by country

References

Veterinary Medicine